Death Race 2 is a 2010 American science fiction action film directed by Roel Reiné, written by Tony Giglio and Paul W. S. Anderson. It is the second installment in the Death Race film series. The film serves as a prequel to Death Race (2008) and was released directly to video on 27 December 2010. The film is followed by a sequel Death Race 3: Inferno (2013)

The film explores the origins of the first "Frankenstein" car driver, Carl "Luke" Lucas (Luke Goss). Alongside Goss, the film also stars Fred Koehler, Tanit Phoenix, Robin Shou, Lauren Cohan, Danny Trejo, Ving Rhames and Sean Bean as the villain. The film received a generally negative critical reaction.

Plot 
Getaway driver Carl "Luke" Lucas is arrested after a robbery for his crime boss Markus Kane goes wrong. As his accomplices are robbing the bank, two officers casually enter the building. Luke tells them to abort, but they refuse; Luke intervenes, but it results in the death of one of the three accomplices. Luke shoots and kills one of the officers and dumps off his accomplices in order to fulfill Markus's wishes. In doing so, Luke is eventually captured by the police following a high-speed chase and sentenced to prison. Six months later, Luke is transferred to Terminal Island.

Terminal Island is a private prison under the control of the Weyland Corporation, which hosts the Death Match, a televised pay-per-view competition where two dangerous convicts are chosen and then forced to fight to the death or submission. The prisoners are given access to weapons or defense items to use during the fight by stepping on a marked plate in the arena. Luke meets the men who eventually become his pit crew in the Death Race: Lists, who annoys him by over-analyzing everything, Goldberg, and Rocco. The host of the Death Match is September Jones, a former Miss Universe who lost her crown due to allegations of having a sexual relationship with all of its judges. She now works for Weyland Corp to create profit from the pay-per-view subscribers of the Death Match.

Luke is approached in the showers by September, who proposes that he fights. When he refuses, she makes sexual advances towards him, which he pretends to go for before refusing. In retaliation, September chooses Lists to fight in a Death Match with the convict Big Bill. Luke confronts her while Lists is running for his life during the event, pleading to let him fight in place of Lists. She refuses and he jumps over a barbed fence to fight for Lists. He is joined by Katrina Banks, a woman convict who is serving as a ring girl with other female convicts. She hits the convict with a round number sign made of metal. A riot breaks out during the fight between Luke and the convict because of racial tension, sparked because Luke is white and the other convict is black. The convicts break down the fence to get in, and some of the rapists attack and attempt to rape the female convicts. Katrina defends herself and helps the other women, who are then evacuated. When the riot control guards intervene, Luke surrenders. Markus, worried that Luke will trade info on his crimes for immunity, discovers his location at Terminal Island while watching the Death Match. Afterward, Luke is well-received when he sees Katrina and inquires about her well-being after the fight.

Markus puts a bounty of $1 million on Luke's head and convinces some of the prisoners to kill him. Meanwhile, Jones comes up with a plan to boost their profits by converting the Death Match into a "Death Race", where the contestants will have to race over days to win each match. The person who manages to win five races will be released from prison, originally credited as Weyland's idea. Luke joins the race, during which other prisoners try to kill him to earn Markus' bounty. The female convicts are brought back to play navigator for each racer, and Katrina is paired with Luke.

During the second race, Luke intervenes in an altercation between two other racers, and saves 14K, who is a member of the Triads. As a result, 14K claims to be indebted to Luke.  Later in the same race, Luke's car - which was sabotaged by one of his pit crew members - crashes after being hit with a heat seeker missile fired by Big Bill (who is later killed by his navigator after he accidentally killed his pit crew); Luke's pit crew arrives and tries to save him, but it is too late and everybody is led to believe that Luke is dead. In reality, he survives with extensive scarring to his face. He joins the race as the new character "Frankenstein," with a mask to hide his identity. As the last race begins, a Triad assassin sent by 14K raids Markus's mansion and executes Markus as a favor to Luke. Lists kills Luke's pit crew member Rocco who tampered with Luke's car, and Luke kills September by running her over with his car, before he races with the other competitors.

Cast
 Luke Goss as Carl "Luke" Lucas / "Frankenstein". His car is driven by Jensen Ames (Jason Statham) in Death Race.
 DeObia Oparei as Bill "Big Bill", one of Carl Lucas' and Calin's rivals. He killed 19 fighters in the Death Match, the most of any driver. His truck is driven by Machine Gun Joe in Death Race.
 Hennie Bosman as Xander Grady, one of 14K's rivals, is the Aryan Brotherhood's leader. He killed 11 fighters in the Death Match, third to Big Bill and 14K. His car is driven by Slovo Pachenko in Death Race.
 Robin Shou as "14K", a tenth-generation Triad member, who was sent to business school and holds a degree from MIT. He killed 14 fighters in the Death Match, second to Big Bill. He is the only racer other than the character of Frankenstein to appear in all three films.
 Warrick Grier as Calin, one of Big Bill's rivals. His car is driven by Carson in Death Race.
 Sean Higgs as Billy "Hillbilly" Hill, His car is driven by Siad in Death Race.
 Trayan Milenov-Troy as "Scarface", His car is driven by Hector Grimm in Death Race.
 Michael Solomon as "Sheik", His car is driven by Travis Colt in Death Race.
 Chase Armitage as "Apache", His car is driven by Riggins in Death Race.
 Tanit Phoenix as Katrina Banks, Luke's navigator and love interest.
 Lauren Cohan as September Jones, Death Race's hostess/executive producer. She is a former Miss Universe who lost her crown due to allegations of having a sexual relationship with all of its judges.
 Fred Koehler as Lists, one of Luke's pit crew and a compulsive data collector. He is the only other person to appear in all four films. He has been sentenced for murdering his mother.
 Ving Rhames as R. H. Weyland, head of Weyland International.
 Danny Trejo as Goldberg, a loyal member of Luke's pit crew.
 Sean Bean as Markus Kane, Luke's former crime boss.
 Patrick Lyster as Medford Parks, Terminal Island Penitentiary's warden. He is later replaced by Claire Hennessey in Death Race. 
 Joe Vaz as Rocco, a former member of Luke's pit crew and a mole for the bounty.
 Wayne Harrison as Sergeant Linus Drago
 Quentin Chong as a Triad assassin under 14K.

.

Sequel
A direct-to-DVD-and-Blu-ray-sequel called Death Race 3: Inferno was released in January 2013.

References

External links
 
 

2010 science fiction action films
2010s road movies
2010 direct-to-video films
2010 films
American science fiction action films
American chase films
American prison films
American road movies
Death Race (franchise)
Direct-to-video prequel films
American dystopian films
2010s English-language films
Films about bank robbery
Films directed by Roel Reiné
Films produced by Paul W. S. Anderson
Films scored by Paul Haslinger
Films shot in South Africa
Films with screenplays by Paul W. S. Anderson
Universal Pictures direct-to-video films
2010s American films
American prequel films